Robert Alexander Andrade (born July 22, 1989) is a Republican member of the Florida Legislature representing the state's 2nd House district, which includes parts of Escambia and Santa Rosa counties.

Education
Andrade attended St. Thomas Aquinas High School. After high school, Andrade graduated in 2011 from the University of Florida with a Bachelor of Science in Advertising from the College of Journalism and Communications.  While at the University of Florida, Andrade competed with the UF Trial Team.

 In 2014, he was inducted into the University of Florida Hall of Fame.

Career 
After completing his Juris Doctor in 2013, Andrade served as a gubernatorial fellow in Governor Rick Scott’s administration. During this time, Andrade served the legislative affairs office of the Department of Transportation. At the conclusion of the fellowship, Andrade received the Governor Jeb Bush Award for Outstanding Achievement by writing a policy proposal entitled Losing “The Campaign” Why Florida Could Save Money and Increase Charitable Giving by Eliminating the Middleman. This policy laid out extensive groundwork to improve Florida’s involvement with charitable organizations and non-profits. Andrade also spent time working in the State Attorney's office as a Certified Legal Intern, helping to prosecute domestic violence.

In 2014, Andrade joined Moore, Hill & Westmoreland, P.A. where he works on cases dealing with Civil Litigation, Real Property, and Commercial Litigation.  During this time, Andrade served as an adjunct professor at the University of West Florida and continues to serve on the Legal Studies Advisory Board.

In 2017, Florida Governor Rick Scott appointed Andrade to serve on the Judicial Nominating Commission for the 1st Circuit Court of Florida. He was reappointed by Florida Governor Ron DeSantis in 2019.

Elected Office 
Andrade is a Republican member of the Florida Legislature representing the state's 2nd House District, which includes parts of Escambia and Santa Rosa counties. Andrade was first elected to serve Florida House District 2 in 2018. In 2020 and 2022 Andrade was reelected to the same office. Andrade currently serves as the Chair of the Infrastructure & Tourism Appropriations Subcommittee and as a member of the following committees: Appropriations Committee, Infrastructure Strategies Committee, Transportation & Modals Subcommittee, Joint Legislative Budget Commission, Rules Committee. Andrade previously served a leadership role in the Education & Employment Committee, where he was the Republican whip for education policy.

In 2020, Andrade was credited with renaming the Pensacola Bay Bridge after Gen. Daniel "Chappie" James Jr. after Rep. Mike Hill failed to pass the same proposal.

In February 2023, Andrade introduced a bill that would overhaul Florida's libel and defamation laws. The bill would reclassify any anonymous source quoted in a publication to "presumptively false" for the purpose of defamation lawsuits, and would remove journalists from protecting the identity of anonymous sources. The bill would also subject people who accuse another of discriminating based on "race, sex, sexual orientation, or gender identity" to legal action and a $35,000 fine if they cannot prove it in a court of law. The Foundation for Individual Rights and Expression, a free speech advocacy group, sharply condemned Andrade's bill.

Community Involvement 

 Escambia County Bar Association
 Onbikes Pensacola, Inc., Founding member
 Big Brothers Big Sisters of Northwest Florida
 Leadership Pensacola, Graduate
 Greater Pensacola Chamber of Commerce, Former Policy Committee Chairman

Elections 
Andrade defeated Greg Merk August 28, 2018 in an open primary, winning 60.5% of the vote.

Andrade defeated Cris Dosev on August 18, 2020 in the Republican primary, winning 62.1% of the vote. In the general election in 2020, Andrade defeated Democrat Dianne Krumel with 55.8% of the vote.

Andrade soundly defeated Greg Litton and Jordan Karr on August 23, 2022 in the Republican primary, winning 65% of the vote. Andrade went on to beat Carollyn Taylor in the general election with 64% of the vote.

Awards 

 Florida Politics named Andrade a "winner" of Florida's 2020 Legislative Session, citing high profile and controversial bills Andrade sponsored.
 President’s Award Recipient for Onbikes Pensacola, Florida Bar Young Lawyers Division
 Best Rising Leader, Inweekly Best of the Coast, 2017
 Florida Gubernatorial Fellowship's Governor Jeb Bush Award for Outstanding Achievement, 2014
 Escambia Santa Rosa Bar Association, Bill Meador Public Service Award
 Florida Policy Institute 2019 Champion for Children Award Recipient
 Florida Chamber of Commerce Honor Roll 2019
 Associated Builders & Contractors of Florida "Legislator of the Year" 2019
Runner Up Best Politician, Inweekly Best of the Coast, 2019
Runner Up Best Politician, Inweekly Best of the Coast, 2020
Champion of Florida Public Broadcasting, 2022

Endorsements 

 Endorsed by Governor Ron DeSantis (2020) 
 Endorsed by the National Rifle Association (2018, 2020, 2022)
 Endorsed by Congressman Matt Gaetz (2020, 2022)
 Endorsed by advocacy group Florida Right to Life (2020).
 Endorsed by the Florida Police Benevolent Association (2020, 2022)
 Endorsed by Florida Professional Firefighters (2020, 2022)
Endorsed by Pensacola Mayor Ashton Hayward, Rep. Frank White, Escambia County Tax Collector Scott Lunsford, Gulf Breeze Mayor Matt Dannheisser

References

External links 
 Florida House of Representatives-Alex Andrade

1989 births
21st-century American politicians
Living people
Republican Party members of the Florida House of Representatives
Andrade, Alex
University of Florida alumni